Jednorożec is a large village (small town by European standards) in Przasnysz County, Poland. Located in the Mazovian Voivodeship, the town is one of the centres of the historical region of Kurpie.

Etymology

The town was named based on the local legend of a beekeeper who saw a unicorn in the area, which was at the time a royal hunting preserve. According to the legend, Prince Janusz III Mazowiecki ordered the building of a hunting lodge on the spot, which he named Jednorożec, meaning "unicorn."

 The coat of arms and the municipal flag of Jednorożec consist of a unicorn accompanied by two bees. The unicorn is shown in the position of a Polish battle horse. The color green symbolizes the area's forested Kurpie past, as well as the current "green" values of the local inhabitants, and the green color also refers to the area as part of what was once "Poland's Green Lungs."

Government
The village of Jednorożec is the seat of the Gmina Jednorożec (administrative district) in Przasnysz County.

The Jednorożec municipal office is located at ul. Odrodzenia 14, 06-323 Jednorożec.

Current departments include:
   Mayor
   Secretary
   Treasurer
   Finance and Budget Office
   Investment and Development Team
   Head of the Office of Civil Status
   Independent Workplace Affairs and Local Government Personnel
   Independent Position for Defense, Civil Protection and Economic Crisis Management
   Independent Workplace - Computer Science
   Stand-alone post for Land Reclamation
   Project Coordinator

History

Jednorożec has a history going back at least three hundred years. It survived the "Swedish invasion of Poland" during the Second Northern War in the 17th century and subsequent occupations by Russia and Germany.

The area now known as Jednorożec was part of a royal estate in the Kurpie forest, and contained no permanent residents in the second half of the 16th century, only meadows and small huts of beekeepers. Beekeeping was highly regulated by law and beekeepers were required to provide "forty hands of honey" (40 rączek miodu) per year as tribute to the estate. In addition, they were required to pay the estate a rent and to serve as serfs for three days during harvest time. Nearby neighbors in Lipa and Małowidz, however, were required to serve as serfs three days a week.

Between 1609 and 1616 the heavily forested area was destroyed by violent storms and forest fires which put the beekeepers out of business. Beekeepers who suffered severe losses appealed to the royal court and were provided sixteen hectares of land, allowed the right to bear arms, and, along with settlers in Lipa and Małowidz, were removed from serfdom by the court. This special status and privilege, first started here, was later extended to other settlement areas in the Puszczy Zagajnica forest of Kurpie, and marked the beginning of agriculture in the area.

The Jednorożec settlement was officially incorporated as a village on August 7, 1650, by a decree from King John II Casimir Vasa, which allowed the beekeepers and farmers, who were already settled there, the official title to their land. The village grew from approximately 40 families in the early 1700s to 80 families in 1781, and Jednorożec then became the second largest town of the parish, after Chorzele. A census in 1827 indicated the town's population was 693 inhabitants housed in 111 homes.

A resolution of the Duchy of Warsaw, dated March 12, 1808, allowed the creation of parochial schooling in Jednorożec, and, in 1809, the first school opened in the village in an old building. A newly built school was funded and established in 1817, and the teacher, John Krajewski, received 300 złoty a year, plus contributions. School attendance was low and often interrupted by the children having to remain at home to help with farm chores.

The settlement and surrounding area survived the Swedish invasion of Poland at the turn of the 17th century and, during the November Uprising and the January Uprising of the years 1863–1864, many of the young men of the town joined the insurgency. During the January Uprising, the surrounding forests provided shelter to the insurgents. It is in this area, near Drążdżewo, the commander of the insurgents hid Zygmunt Padlewski with his division after Padlewski's defeat at Myszyniec. Russian czarist troops moved into the area, and a battle was fought which resulted in Padlewski losing the battle with 50 of his insurgents killed in action or drowned while escaping.

In 1867 a gmina (commune) was established with Jednorożec as its seat.  Gmina Jednorożec contained 586 houses and 4,376 inhabitants (in 1882) and was contained within an area of 35,391 hectares.  In the Jednorożec gmina were the chapel, the office of the municipality, the municipal court, post border guards, forestry office, four tar factories, three windmills, and two inns.

The village prospered well until the middle of the 19th century when natural disasters (drought, fire, hailstones) and resultant soil depletion caused an economic crisis. In addition, on May 18, 1848, a fire, initially caused by lightning, burned down 80 houses and injured 50 people. The economic situation became so desperate the church urged parishioners to "cease drinking vodka." Education suffered during this period of Russian czarist occupation when the Jednorożec school was directed to teach all courses in the Russian language, which was strongly resented and opposed by the villagers. In addition, since villagers now had not the money to pay for school tuition, attendance fell to twenty percent by 1890. In 1889, Jednorożec contained around 118 farms and there were also 45 families with no land. In 1890 villagers refused to pay taxes, which resulted in the arrival of Russian troops to collect taxes by force.

Severe economic hardship continued through the end of the 19th century, causing many of the townspeople to emigrate to the United States or to seek seasonal work in Prussia.

When World War I occurred, inhabitants of Jednorożec and nearby towns in the gmina were displaced and in turmoil in November and December 1914 when Germans and Russians fought fierce battles near Przasnysz. Many fled to nearby towns or hid in the woods until the fighting was over. Another fight broke out in early spring 1915.  Until then, Jednorożec was occupied by Tsarist troops.  German forces attacked on Feb. 17, 1915 in the direction of Jednorożec with the objective of attacking Przasnysz. As a result of heavy fighting on 24 February Przasnysz was captured, but soon the Russians went into a counteroffensive, but were not able to oust the Germans from the area. In early March, when the Russians attacked the Germans, Jednorożec was on the front lines and, by March 1915, more than half of the village was destroyed. A Polish resistance group, called "Polish Military Organisation" (Polska Organizacja Wojskowa) was formed during the war and included a number of the village's residents, including Franciszek Berk, Stanisław Kardaś, Władysław Mordwa, Jan Sobieraj, Antoni Wilga and Józef Wilga.

When, in August 1915 residents began returning to Jednorożec, which was now under German occupation until 1918, there were only three remaining buildings: the parsonage, a house and a granary. Inhabitants were dying of starvation, and efforts were made to reconstruct the town. Peace eventually returned to the area until August 1920, when, for a few days, the area was occupied by Bolshevik troops.

Residents quickly rebuilt after the devastation of the village during the years 1914–1915. Jednorożec in the interwar period once again became economically strong and a thriving village with 160 houses and 869 inhabitants.  All were of Polish nationality and observed the Catholic faith.

A monument on the main street in town is dedicated to all those who emigrated from the town to America during the mass emigration period of 1870–1910.

Today 

Modern Jednorożec is largely agricultural. Today, residents in the town live in new homes alongside refurbished and preserved older homes.

Historic sites, monuments and buildings are well preserved by the townspeople who are proud of their Jednorożec heritage. A nearby cemetery is well-tended and visited often by residents, to honor their forebearers of the past centuries.

As a measure of permanence of the population, in June 2001 a festival was held to celebrate the 300th anniversary of some of the town's families whose Jednorożec roots were traced back to 1701.

The celebration was attended, not only by the local townspeople, but by Jednorożec descendants from America who came to pay honor to their heritage.

Historic Jednorożec families 

Family surnames of those born in Jednorożec during the period 1700 to 1890 include:

Antosiak, Bakula, Berk, Bilek, Bitkiem, Blaszkiewicz, Bolinski, Cesarz, Chudzik, Deptula, Duda, Dybinski, Forman, Frontczak, Giardow, Godlewski, Grabowski, Gwiazda, Jozwik, Kardas, Kiec, Kieszczyk, Krajewski, Krawczyk, Krulak, Kuligowski, Kulpan, Kuta, Maka, Maluchnik, Matusiak, Matwicki, Merchel, Mordwa, Mortwionek, Nowotka, Nowotkow, Obrebski, Olender, Opalach, Orzol, Ososki, Pazdrag, Piorkowski, Piotrak, Podym, Pogorzelski, Prusik, Przybylek, Przybytek, Renof, Rykoski, Sasin, Sedrowski, Sidwa, Sierpienski, Sobieraj, Sobiski, Sopech, Stancel, Stefaniak, Suchowiecki, Symolon, Szczepanik, Szewczyk, Szlaga, Sztambor, Wilga, Wroblow, Zaleski, Zokewski, Zygmunt.

Churches
Four churches located in Jednorożec serve the Catholic population of the town and surrounding areas:
 Christ Redeemer, Polon 74
 Saint Anthony, Olszewka 79
 Saint Florian, ul. Koscielna 1 A
 Saint Stanislaus Bishop and Martyr, Parciaki 28

Local newspapers and publications
 Głos Gminy Jednorożec
 Źródła do dziejów Ziemi Jednorożeckiej
 Słowa najprostsze

Gallery

See also 
 Kurpie
 Gmina Jednorożec

References

External links
 Village website

Villages in Przasnysz County
Warsaw Voivodeship (1919–1939)